Rainer Strecker (born 25 October 1965) is a German actor.

Life
Strecker trained as an actor at the Otto-Falckenberg-Schule in Munich.

Awards

Selected filmography

Audio

Rainer Strecker spricht die Hörbuchreihe der Tintenwelt, sowie die Reckless Spiegelwelt Reihe,  von Cornelia Funke. Des Weiteren liest er das Hörbuch Drachenreiter, ebenfalls von Cornelia Funke und andere Kinderbücher von unterschiedlichen Autoren.

Theatre

References

External links
 
 
 Agency Velvet 
 Vip.de 

1965 births
Living people
German male film actors
German male television actors